Events in the year 1948 in Norway.

Incumbents
 Monarch – Haakon VII
 Prime Minister – Einar Gerhardsen (Labour Party)

Events
 30 August – The opening of the University of Bergen.
 2 October – Bukken Bruse disaster: a flying boat crashes upon landing in Trondheim, Norway; 19 are killed; Bertrand Russell is among the 24 survivors.
 12 June - Danmark - Norge 1-2, treningskamp Norway beat Denmark 1-2 in a football training match.

 29 February – The Kråkerøy speech: Prime minister Einar Gerhardsen attacks the communists in a dramatic speech. 
 December - The first Donald Duck & Co cartoon magazine is released in Norway.
 9 December – Riksteatret (The National Travelling Theatre) is established.

Popular culture

Sports

Music

Film

Literature

Notable births
 
 
 
 
 
 
 

10 January – Ellen Kjellberg, dancer.
15 January – Kenneth Hugdahl, psychologist and author
27 January – Arne Skauge, politician and minister
31 January – Per Bjørang, speed skater and Sprint World Champion
2 February – John Thune, politician
24 February – Modulf Aukan, politician
4 March – Ernst Håkon Jahr, linguist
5 March – Tore Tønne, politician and minister (d. 2002)
12 March – Rolf Reikvam, politician
14 March – Sten Osther, handball player
18 March – Ola T. Lånke, politician
19 March – Leif Jenssen, weightlifter and Olympic gold medallist
23 March – Knut Magne Myrland, singer, guitarist and songwriter (died 2021).
3 April – Thor Lillehovde, politician
6 April – Philip Øgaard, cinematographer
19 April – Geir Røse, handball player
1 May – Bård Tønder, judge
4 May – Aud Kvalbein, politician
25 May 
Per Oskar Kjølaas, bishop
Arild Stubhaug, poet and biographer
30 May – 
Inga Ravna Eira, Northern Sami language poet, children's writer and translator.
Morten M. Kristiansen, illustrator.
31 May – Bård Mikkelsen, businessperson
6 June – Knut Kjeldstadli, historian
15 June – Asgeir Almås, politician
16 June – Gunnar Steintveit, lawyer and judge
23 June – Kari Nordheim-Larsen, politician and minister
29 June – Helge Karlsen, international soccer player
30 June – Dag Fornæss, speed skater and World Champion
6 July – Inger S. Enger, politician
9 July 
Leiv Kristen Sydnes, chemist
Gunnar Torvund, sculptor.
Gunnar Viken, politician
13 July – Alf Hansen, rower and Olympic gold medallist
22 July – Oddbjørg Ausdal Starrfelt, politician
23 July – Steinar Tjomsland, judge
26 July – Svein Ole Sæther, diplomat
4 August – Per Ankre, handball player
10 August – Per Ivar Gjærum, economist
11 August – Laila Dåvøy, politician and minister
16 August – Arne Bergodd, rower and Olympic silver medallist
25 August – Kjell Arne Bratli, writer and Norwegian Parliamentary Ombudsman for the Armed Forces
29 August – Jens Revold, politician
3 September – Oddbjørn Vatne, politician
18 September – Geir Karlsen, soccer player
20 September 
Terje Hanssen, biathlete
Frida Nokken, civil servant
25 September 
Peter Gullestad, civil servant
Petter Vennerød, film director
26 September – Svein Munkejord, politician and minister
28 September – Knut Børø, long-distance runner
11 October – Sharon Johansen, model and actress
12 October – Kari Sørheim, politician
21 October – I. H. Monrad Aas, researcher
25 October – Sigleif Johansen, biathlete
3 November – Elsa Skarbøvik, politician
11 November 
Marit Christensen, journalist
Ole Christian Kvarme, bishop
12 November – Magnhild Meltveit Kleppa, politician and minister
22 November – Jens Harald Bratlie, pianist and professor
24 November – Sture Arntzen, trade unionist
29 November – Geir Ellingsrud, professor of mathematics
2 December – Eyvind Hellstrøm, chef and television presenter
10 December – Harald Espelund, politician
15 December – Olaf Gjedrem, politician

Full date unknown
Dag Album, sociologist
Gunnar Sørbø, anthropologist
Knut Sprauten, historian

Notable deaths

1 January – Hans Clarin Hovind Mustad, businessperson (b. 1871)
21 January – Ambrosia Tønnesen, sculptor (b. 1859).
30 January – Peter Andreas Morell, politician and minister (b. 1868)
7 February
Alf Aanning, gymnast and Olympic silver medallist (b. 1896)
Poul Heegaard, Danish mathematician active in the field of topology, professor in mathematics at the University of Copenhagen 1910–1917, professor in mathematics at the University of Kristiania 1917–1941 (b. 1871)
9 April – Cato Andreas Sverdrup, politician (b. 1896)
26 April – Johan Olaf Bredal, politician and minister (b. 1862)
23 June – Sven Oftedal, politician and minister (b. 1905)
4 August – Kristoffer Olsen, sailor and Olympic gold medallist (b. 1883).
16 August – Paul Pedersen, gymnast and Olympic silver medallist (b. 1886)
28 August – Ragnar Skancke, politician and minister (b. 1890)
30 August – Kristine Bonnevie, biologist and Norway's first female professor (b. 1872)
7 October – Johan Hjort, fisheries scientist, marine zoologist and oceanographer (b. 1869)
8 October – Olaf Bryn, politician (b. 1872)
12 October – Nils Trædal, cleric, politician and minister (b. 1879)
22 December – Emanuel Vigeland, artist (b. 1875)

Full date unknown
Agnar Johannes Barth, forester (b. 1871)
Ivar Flem, newspaper editor (b. 1865).
Gustav Adolf Lammers Heiberg, barrister and politician (b. 1875)

See also

References

External links